Qinyuan County is a county in the south-central part of Shanxi province, China. It is the westernmost county-level division of Changzhi City.

Climate

References

www.xzqh.org 

County-level divisions of Shanxi
Changzhi